Metalaxyl is an acylalanine fungicide with systemic function. Its chemical name is methyl N-(methoxyacetyl)-N-(2,6-xylyl)-DL-alaninate.  It can be used to control Pythium in a number of vegetable crops, and Phytophthora in peas. Metalaxyl-M is the ISO common name and Ridomil Gold is the trade name for the optically pure (-) / D / R active stereoisomer, which is also known as mefenoxam.

It is the active ingredient in the seed treatment agent Apron XL LS.

The fungicide has suffered severe  problems. The fungicide was marketed for use against Phytophthora infestans. However, in the summer of 1980, in the Republic of Ireland, the crop was devastated by a potato blight epidemic after a resistant race of the oomycete appeared. Irish farmers later successfully sued the company for their losses.
Maximum pesticide residue limits for the EU/UK are set at 0.5 mg/kg for oranges and 1.0 mg/kg for apples. As early as 1998 Pythium was known to be widely developing resistance to metalaxyl which was the most effective control at the time. Various Pythium populations have been known to have resistance to mefenoxam since the 1980s and metalaxyl since 1984. There is wide variability in resistance/sensitivity between Pythium species, with some populations showing complete ineffectiveness.

References

External links 
 
 

Fungicides
Alkyl-substituted benzenes